The Islamic monuments and historical buildings of Mosul, Iraq are of varied ages. They are usually mosques and shrines, but there are also Hussainiyahs, fortresses and madrasahs. Muslims of Mosul are predominantly followers of Sunni Islam, with a minority of Shia Muslims.

Mosul Grand Mosque
The largest mosque of Mosul in Iraq. It was previously called Saddam Mosque in the name of the Iraqi president Saddam Hussein. It is situated in the Taqafah district bordering the Tigris river near the Nineveh archeological site. Its construction started during the Saddam Hussein regime, but works were interrupted because of the political instability in the country and it remains incomplete to this day. Reportedly the United Arab Emirates offered to finance the completion of the mosque on condition of the mosque being renamed Zayed Mosque in the name of the UAE Emir Zayed bin Sultan Al Nahyan but the offer was refused.

Great Mosque of Nur al-Din

The Great Mosque was originally built under Nur al-Din al-Zangi Atabeg of Damascus, who occupied Mosul in 1170 after taking control from his brother Saif el Din Ghazi bin Qutb al-Din al Zingi. It may have been a development of a previous Mosque.  All that remains from this complex are the minaret, two mihrabs, an inscribed marble slab, and some stucco decoration.

The elaborate 52′ (15.5m) brick minaret that leans like the Tower of Pisa is called Al-Hadba (The Humped).
The Great Mosque was destroyed 21 June 2017, in what Iraqi forces claim to be by ISIL.

Mosque of the Prophet Jonah

On one of the two most prominent mounds of Nineveh's ruins rose the Mosque of the prophet Jonah (Al-Nabi Yunus Mosque), the son of Amittai. When built, the mosque replaced an Assyrian Church believed to be the burial place of Jonah and called Jonah's Tomb. Also, Assyrian King Esarhaddon (681–669 BC) previously built a palace on the site.

This shrine on the site of a Christian church was a short distance away from the built-up walls and gates of Nineveh. In the middle of the mosque stood a sepulcher, covered with a Persian carpet of silk and silver, and at the four corners, great copper candlesticks with wax tapers, besides several lamps and ostrich eggshells that hung down from the roof. A whale's tooth, appropriate to Jonah's well-known adventure at sea, was said to be preserved there. A saint named Sheikh Rashid Lolan was also buried at the mosque under a domed tomb.

It was one of the most important mosques in Mosul and one of the few historic mosques in the east side of the city.

On 24 July 2014, the building was blown up by the Islamic State, damaging several nearby houses. They stated "the mosque had become a place for apostasy, not prayer."

In March 2017, after ISIS was driven out, a system of tunnels about one kilometre long were found under the mosque. Although all moveable items had been removed there were still Assyrian reliefs, structures and carvings along the walls.

Green Mosque

The Green Mosque dates back to 12th century AD, and is distinguished for its dome and elaborately wrought mihrab. It is also known as the Al-Khidr Mosque. On 26 February 2015 the mosque was destroyed by explosives by ISIL.

Mosque of Jerjis (Saint George) 

The Mosque of Jerjis is believed by Muslims to be the burial place of Jerjis (known in Christianity as Saint George). It was made of marble with beautiful reliefs and was last renovated in 1393.  The explorer Ibn Jubair mentioned it in the 12th century, and it is believed also to contain the tomb of Al-Hur bin Yousif. The court of the Umayyad ruler at the time, is thought to be not far from this mosque.

On 27 July 2014, the Jerjis Mosque was destroyed by Islamic State.

Mausoleum of Yahya Abu al-Qasim 

Situated on the right bank of the Tigris, it is known for its conical dome, decorative brickwork and calligraphy engraved in Mosul blue marble of the 13th century.

On 23 July 2014, the Mausoleum of Yahya Abu al-Qasim was destroyed by Islamic State.

Mosque of Imam Bahir

The Imam Al-Bahir Mosque was a historic mosque in the city of Mosul, Iraq. It was also known as Jami-Imam-bahir. The mosque was commissioned by the Zangid ruler Badr al-Din Lu'lu' in the same year of his death. It contained the tomb of Imam al-Baher, which was situated next to the prayer hall. The door to the shrine was made by blue marbles, and the ledges made of marble had the Throne Verse of the Qur'an inscribed on it.  A mihrab existed to the south of the tomb, and it was also made of blue marbles and adorned with the Qur'anic verses. The prayer hall was topped by a green 17 meters dome. In 2014, the mosque was destroyed by the Islamic State of Iraq and Levant by explosives.

Mosque and tomb of the Prophet Seth 
A mosque and shrine to Seth existed in the city but was destroyed on 26 July 2014 by Islamic State.

Shrine of Al-Nabi Danyal (Daniel) 
The tomb of Prophet Daniel in Mahallat al-Ahmadiyya, West Mosul, was destroyed by ISIL. Before destruction, the shrine had a small green dome and underneath the dome, a sarcophagus draped with green cloth.

Mosque of Hema Kado/ Hamu Al-Qadu 
Hema Kado Mosque, an Ottoman-era mosque in Mosul's central square, also known as Hamu Al-Qadu Mosque or Mosque of the Pasha and dating from 1881 was destroyed by Islamic State, because it contained the tomb of ‛Ala’ al-Din ibn ‛Abd al-Qadir al-Kaylani that was visited every Thursday and Friday by local Muslims.

Mosque of Al-Muhsin 

It was a historic mosque in Mosul, Iraq. It was located in Al-Shifa' neighborhood, near the Bash Tapia Castle and in front of the Mausoleum of Yahya Abu al-Qasim. The mosque was initially built as a madrasa known as Madrasa al-Nouri, which was commissioned by the Seljuk ruler Nour ad-Din ibn Ezzadeen in the late-12th century. It became a mausoleum after refurbishment by the Zangid ruler Badr al-Din Lu'lu'. He turned one of the rooms into a shrine and mausoleum of Imam Muhsin, and added a musholla (prayer space) and a minbar. The mausoleum was destroyed by the Islamic State of Iraq and Levant in 2015 after an attempt to loot the mosque.

Shrine of Imam Awn-Al Din 
The shrine of Imam Awn-Al Din was built by Badr Al-Din Lulu in the Atabeg Period, 646. The shrine was built in a cemetery, surrounded by graves. The structure survived the 13th Century Mongol Invasion.

However in 25 July 2014, the shrine was damaged with explosives planted by ISIL. Before the destruction, bulldozers were also used as well.

Mosque and tomb of Qadib Al-Ban Mosuli 
The tomb of Sheikh Qadib Al-Ban Al Mosuli was originally his house, the Saint was buried in his house. The site was reconstructed by Ahmad Ibn Salih in 1123, and rebuilt again in 1358. The tomb and mosque was of Atabeg origin however it was also rebuilt during Ottoman era.

In 2014 ISIL destroyed the structure with explosives.

Mosque of Shaykh Al-Shatt 
The structure was a complex of a mosque and shrine. The shrine was originally a Takiyya (Sufi lodge) built in the mosque courtyard by Muhammad Efendi al-Afghani, also known as Shaykh Al-Shatt. Muhammad Efendi al-Afghani was buried in the Takiyya, thus the mosque and shrine were also visited. The tomb was destroyed in 2014 by Islamic State of Iraq and the Levant. The mosque however, still stands.

Mosques and hussainiyahs 
Historical mosques:

 Great Mosque of Al-Nuri
 Mosque of Hamu Al-Qadu 
 Mosque of Imam Al-Baher
 Mosque of Imam Abbas (also known as Hussainiyah Al-Qubba)
 Mosque of Al-Imam Muhsin
 Mosque and shrine of Sheikh Fathi Al-Mawsili
 Mosque of Imam Ibrahim
 Mosque of Shaykh Qadeeb Al-Ban Al-Mawsili
 Sultan Uways Mosque
 Al-Nabi Yunus Mosque
 Al-Nabi Shith Mosque
 Al-Nabi Jirjis Mosque
 Mosque of Muhammad Al-Abariqi
 Al-Shahwan Mosque (also known as the Mosque of Shaykh al-Shatt)

Modern mosques:

 Mosul Grand Mosque
 Hussaniyah Al-Faisaliya

Mausoleums and shrines 
Large mausoleums:
 Mausoleum of Imam Yahya ibn al-Qasim
 Mausoleum of Imam Awn Al-Din
 Shrine of Al-Nabi Danyal
 Shrine of Abu al-Hawawin
 Shrine of Isa Dadah Al-Jilani
 Sayyidah Zaynab Mosque (Sinjar)

Small mausoleums:
 Tomb of the Girl (Tomb of Ibn al-Athir)

Miscellaneous 
Medieval buildings:
 Bash Tapia Castle

Madrasahs:
 Imam Abdaal Madrasa

See also 
 Churches and monasteries of Mosul

Notes

External links

 Illustrated report on the Mosque of the Prophet Jonah / Nabi Yunis and its destruction.

 
Islam in Mosul
Buildings and structures destroyed by ISIL